The blue-moustached bee-eater (Merops mentalis) is a species of bird in the family Meropidae.
It is found in Cameroon, Ivory Coast, Equatorial Guinea, Ghana, Guinea, Liberia, Nigeria, and Sierra Leone.

The blue-moustached bee-eater is a rainforest bird usually found singly. It perches on a high branch in the canopy beside tracks and clearings and swoops down on small butterflies, honeybees and other insects before returning to its original perch.

References

blue-moustached bee-eater
Birds of the Gulf of Guinea
Birds of West Africa
blue-moustached bee-eater